Girl from Havana is a 1940 American drama film directed by Lew Landers and written by Malcolm Stuart Boylan and Karl Brown. The film stars Dennis O'Keefe, Claire Carleton, Victor Jory, Steffi Duna, Gordon Jones and Bradley Page. The film was released on September 11, 1940, by Republic Pictures.

Plot
Woody and Tex, a pair of American oilmen working in South America, both fall for a beautiful young woman they simply call "Havana." The more prosperous suitor is Tex, who just earned a $2,500 bonus due to Woody planting explosives to bring oil up in his derrick, but the oil comes up in Tex's instead. Tex doesn't share the bounty that sets the two against each other. Woody bets Tex in love when Havana is more smitten with Woody, who lands in jail after using Havana's loaded dice in a craps game.

Woody, fired from his job, is sprung by pal Tubby Waters, who is then killed by a man named Drenov in a fight when he tries to protect Woody. Woody avenges him by killing Drenov, whose job he is promptly offered as a gunrunner to Captain Lazear, a revolutionary.

Sensing that he is in grave danger, Havana ventures into the jungle to find Woody near a hidden storehouse of ammunition. explosives and weapons including Tommy guns and hand grenades. There she encounters Lazear's jealous girlfriend, Chita, and pretends she and Woody are married. Tex arrives to help Woody fight off the revolutionaries using the smuggled arms, then is by their side again when Woody and Havana are actually wed.

Cast 
Dennis O'Keefe as Woody Davis
Claire Carleton as Havana
Victor Jory as Tex Moore
Steffi Duna as Chita
Gordon Jones as Tubby Waters
Bradley Page as Cort
Addison Richards as Harrigan
Abner Biberman as Captain Lazear
William Edmunds as Ricco
Trevor Bardette as Drenov
Jay Novello as Manuel
Frank Lackteen as Captured smuggler

Soundtrack
 Girl from Havana 
Music by Jule Styne
Lyrics by Sol Meyer and George R. Brown
 Querido, Take Me Tonight
Music by Jule Styne
Lyrics by Sol Meyer and George R. Brown
 Terrace Rhumba
Music by Cy Feuer
 Midnight Tango 
Music by William Lava

References

External links
 

1940 films
American drama films
1940 drama films
Republic Pictures films
Films directed by Lew Landers
Films scored by William Lava
American black-and-white films
1940s English-language films
1940s American films